Chengguan synonymously referred to as Chamdo or Qamdo is a major town in the historical region of Kham in the eastern Tibet Autonomous Region of China. The seat of Karub District and Chamdo Prefecture, it is Tibet's third largest city after Lhasa and Shigatse with a population of 45,861 in 2010. By road, the distance is  via the southern route or  via the northern route.

Historically, Chamdo was a hub of the Tea Horse Road, leading from Sichuan to Bengal via the Nathu La pass. At the turn of the 20th century it had a population of about 12,000, a quarter of whom were monks.

Galden Jampaling Monastery

Chengguan was visited by Je Tsongkhapa in 1373 who suggested a monastery be built there. Galden Jampaling Monastery was constructed between 1436 and 1444 by a disciple of Tsongkhapa, Jansem Sherab Zangpo. It is also known as the Changbalin or Qiangbalin Si Monastery. At its height it contained five main temples and housed some 2,500 monks. It was destroyed in 1912 but the main hall (which was used as a prison) and two other buildings survived, and it was rebuilt in 1917 after the Tibetan army retook Chengguan. It now houses about 800 monks.

Climate
Chengguan experiences a climate that is a transition between a humid continental and subtropical highland climate (Köppen Dwb and Cwb), with warm, wet summers and very dry, frosty winters. Due to the high elevation, the diurnal temperature variation is large throughout the year, averaging  annually.

Transportation 
China National Highway 214
China National Highway 317
Qamdo Bangda Airport

Notable people
Qiangba Puncog, politician

See also
History of Tibet

References

Further reading 
 Buckley, Michael and Straus, Robert (1986): Tibet: a travel survival kit, Lonely Planet Publications. South Yarra, Victoria, Australia. .
 Forbes, Andrew ; Henley, David (2011). China's Ancient Tea Horse Road. Chiang Mai: Cognoscenti Books. ASIN: B005DQV7Q2
 Gruschke, Andreas (2004): Chamdo town in: The Cultural Monuments of Tibet’s Outer Provinces: Kham - vol. 1. The TAR part of Kham,  White Lotus Press, Bangkok 2004, pp. 36–45. 
 Mayhew, Bradley and Kohn, Michael. (2005). Tibet. 6th Edition. Lonely Planet. 

Populated places in Chamdo
Township-level divisions of Tibet
Karub District